Mariette Protin (16 April 1906 – 2 July 1993) was a French freestyle swimmer who competed in the 1924 Summer Olympics.

In 1924 she was a member of the French relay team which finished fifth in the 4 x 100 metre freestyle relay competition. She also participated in the 100 metre freestyle event and in the 400 metre freestyle competition but in both she was eliminated in the semi-finals.

References

External links
profile

1906 births
Olympic swimmers of France
Swimmers at the 1924 Summer Olympics
1993 deaths
Women's World Games medalists
French female freestyle swimmers
20th-century French women